Bobtown may refer to:

Bobtown, Illinois
Bobtown, Indiana
Bobtown, Kentucky
Bobtown, Pennsylvania
Bobtown, Virginia